Workhorse Group Incorporated, originally AMP Electric Vehicles, is an original equipment manufacturer and technology company headquartered in Cincinnati, Ohio, U.S. Workhorse makes electric delivery vans, drones, and telematics software designed for last-mile delivery. Their products include commercial electric vehicles, Horsefly delivery drones, and a Metron telematics software system.

History
Workhorse Custom Chassis, LLC was founded in 1998 by investors who took over the production of General Motors' P30/P32 series stepvan and motorhome chassis. By 2005, they were taken over by Navistar International, which had been selling them diesel engines. Navistar then shuttered the plant in 2012 to cut costs after having suffered heavy losses.

In March 2013, AMP Electric Vehicles took over Workhorse Custom Chassis, LLC's assets and began offering a range of electric vehicles. In 2015, AMP changed its company name to Workhorse Group Incorporated. On January 4, 2016, the company was approved by Nasdaq Capital Market and its common stock started being quoted on Nasdaq under the symbol “WKHS” (NASDAQ: WKHS).

In February 2019, Steve Burns, co-founder of AMP Electric Vehicles and CEO of Workhorse resigned from the company. President and COO Duane Hughes became the new CEO of Workhorse.

In November 2021 it was reported that Workhorse faced a Department of Justice investigation as well as a SEC investigation that was first reported in a September 2021 report by shortselling research firm Fuzzy Panda who accused the company of fraud which was followed up by a Cincinnati Enquirer report which found that top Workhorse executives and board members sold off $60 million worth of stock and that part of the selling occurred following interactions with postal officials which signaled their USPS bid was in trouble. The report also stated that Workhorse was being sued by some shareholders in the company, which accuses them orchestrating its USPS as part of an insider trading scheme. On November 9, 2021, Workhorse confirmed its SEC and Department of Justice investigations in a regulatory filling which stated that the investigations were related to the trade of securities in the company leading up to the award of the USPS contract to Oshkosh.

Lordstown Plant & Licensing Agreement

On May 8, 2019, General Motors confirmed that it was in talks to potentially sell Lordstown Assembly, its idle 6.2 million square foot manufacturing plant in Lordstown, Ohio to Workhorse Group. On November 7, 2019, the newly-constituted Lordstown Motors, of which Workhorse Group had a 10% stake, purchased the shuttered Lordstown Assembly Plant from General Motors. Workhorse CEO Steve Burns assumed the role of co-founder and CEO of Lordstown Motors. Later that day, Workhorse Group issued a press release detailing a licensing agreement with Lordstown Motors for their W-15 pickup truck. Burns resigned as CEO of Lordstown Motors on June 14, 2021.

Products

Aerial vehicles

Octocopter
In December 2018, Workhorse announced that they would debut its SureFly, an electric vertical take off and landing octocopter at the 2019 North American International Auto Show. The SureFly would be built for air medical services, military organizations, agricultural customers, and for urban commuting. In December 2019, aerospace company Moog Inc. bought the SureFly program for $5 million. Moog planned to use the SureFly as a demonstrator for autonomous delivery vehicles.

HorseFly drone
Workhorse began the development of a truck-mounted drone called HorseFly in 2016. The HorseFly drone was developed in collaboration with defense contractor Moog (NYSE:MOG.A). Unmanned medical delivery capabilities of the HorseFly was also developed in partnership with San Diego-based Unmanned Systems Operations Group Inc.

Discontinued vehicles

Workhorse Custom Chassis, LLC

In 2002, Workhorse Custom Chassis, LLC's first product was the P-series, based on the Chevrolet/GMC P30-series stepvan/mobile home chassis.

Workhorse briefly offered an integrated chassis/body model called the MetroStar, hearkening back to the long-lived International Harvester Metro Van line. This product was led by then parent company Navistar.

Workhorse was also involved with the construction of Navistar's eStar electric van, until that product was cancelled in early 2013.

Until 2015, the company offered the familiar W62 chassis and a newer, narrow-tracked version called the W88. Workhorse had originally manufactured an earlier version, the W42 chassis.

W-15 (pickup truck)

In November 2016, Workhorse announced that they were working on an electrically powered pickup truck, called the W-15. North Carolina's Duke Energy stated that it would buy 500 of the vehicles, and the city of Orlando also reported interested. It was planned to have 460 horsepower and a battery range of 80 miles. A gasoline range extender was to supply further range. In March 2020, Workhorse confirmed that it had transferred the W-15 pickup truck project to Lordstown Motors through a licensing agreement. Lordstown Motors paid a licensing fee to Workhorse, and the truck will be produced in the future without the gasoline range extender. The W-15 became the basis of the Lordstown Endurance pickup truck.

C-Series (electric delivery van)

Workhorse was one of the finalists for the 10-year United States Postal Service contract for the Next Generation Delivery Vehicle (NGDV) to replace 165,000 aging and outdated Grumman LLVs that had been used by USPS since 1987. In February 2021, the contract was awarded to Oshkosh Defense. Workhorse announced what Bloomberg News described as a "long-shot bid" to overturn the loss of the award. On June 16, 2021, Workhorse filed a formal complaint with the United States Court of Federal Claims protesting the award of the United States Postal Service Next Generation Delivery Vehicle ("USPS NGDV") contract to Oshkosh Defense. However this complaint was dropped in September 2021.

The prototype NGDV candidate chassis was modified and reused for both the W-15 pickup and the N-GEN delivery van for commercial fleets. In June 2019, Workhorse obtained US$25 million to continue the delivery van project, which had a temporary name of N-GEN. By November 2019, Workhorse changed the name of the delivery van from N-GEN to C-Series. In November 2019, Workhorse chose battery supplier EnerDel to provide up to 5,200 battery packs for C-Series delivery vans. The C-series was intended to be built at a former General Motors factory in Lordstown, Ohio.

Workhorse developed a flagship electric van model C-1000 and started shipping it in the summer of 2021. However, after the initial sales, the company announced the truck would be redesigned to increase payload capacity. In September 2021 Workhorse suspended all deliveries of the vehicle and recalled 41 vans that were already delivered to customers with the company stating that it needed to provide "additional testing and modifications" to comply with US safety standards. In November 2021 CEO Rick Dauch admitted during a conference call that he believed the C-1000 was unreliable.

See also
 Multi-stop truck
 Navistar International
 Lordstown Motors

References

External links

 

Electric trucks
Battery electric vehicle manufacturers
American companies established in 1998
Vehicle manufacturing companies established in 1998
Motor vehicle manufacturers based in Ohio
Manufacturing companies based in Cincinnati
Electric vehicle manufacturers of the United States
Companies listed on the Nasdaq
1998 establishments in Indiana